Sulimy may refer to the following places:
Sulimy, Łódź Voivodeship (central Poland)
Sulimy, Podlaskie Voivodeship (north-east Poland)
Sulimy, Giżycko County in Warmian-Masurian Voivodeship (north Poland)
Sulimy, Pisz County in Warmian-Masurian Voivodeship (north Poland)